Lutkes Meule  was a small smock mill in Nijeveen, Drenthe, the Netherlands. It was built in 1990 and dismantled in June 2009.

History
Lutke's Meule was built in 1990 by Gerard Lutke, miller at De Sterrenberg. The mill was able to turn by wind by October 1992 and a pair of millstones were installed in 1993. In 2008, one of the wooden stocks broke, reducing the mill to two sails. Development in the surrounding area had reduced the ability of the wind to power the mill. In June 2009 Lutke's Meule was dismantled. It is intended that it will be rebuilt in New Zealand.

Description

Lutke's Meule was what the Dutch describe as an "achtkante stellingmolen". The base and smock were covered in weatherboards and the cap was covered in Dakleer. The mill was winded by tailpole and winch. The leading edges were streamlined using the Faueël system. The sails were carried in a wooden windshaft. The mill drove one pair of  diameter millstones.

References

Windmills in Drenthe
Smock mills in the Netherlands
Windmills completed in 1990
Grinding mills in the Netherlands
Octagonal buildings in the Netherlands
Buildings and structures demolished in 2009
1990 establishments in the Netherlands
2009 disestablishments in the Netherlands
Meppel
20th-century architecture in the Netherlands